Xaltocan Municipality is a municipality in Tlaxcala in south-eastern Mexico.

The seat is at Xaltocan, Tlaxcala.

References

Municipalities of Tlaxcala